Ma Xueya (born 16 December 1993) is a Chinese basketball player. She represented China at the 2018 FIBA Women's Basketball World Cup.

References

External links

Living people
1993 births
Basketball players from Hebei
Sportspeople from Handan
Chinese women's basketball players
Power forwards (basketball)
Xinjiang Magic Deer players
Shanxi Flame players
Basketball players at the 2010 Summer Youth Olympics
Youth Olympic gold medalists for China
Asian Games medalists in basketball
Basketball players at the 2014 Asian Games
Asian Games silver medalists for China
Medalists at the 2014 Asian Games
21st-century Chinese women